Mihai Mircea Neșu (born 19 February 1983) is a Romanian former footballer and philanthropist.

A left-back, Neșu played as a senior for Steaua București and FC Utrecht, as well as being capped eight times for the Romania national team. His footballing career ended at age 28, when he suffered a severe neck injury that left him paralysed.

After his accident, Neșu started a personal foundation dedicated to children with motor disorders, at the same time receiving treatment for his paralysis from which he did not make a full recovery.

Club career

Steaua București
Neșu, who was nicknamed Bișonul (Romanian for "the Bichon"), was born in Oradea and started to play football with the junior squads of Bihor Oradea. He was transferred to Steaua București in 2001 for $6,000 and made his Divizia A debut on 21 April 2002, when head coach Victor Pițurcă used him in a 1–1 draw with Petrolul Ploiești.

During his time in the capital, Neșu aided the club in winning the national title in the 2004–05 and the 2005–06 seasons. He also amassed 33 games in European competitions, of which twelve in the latter campaign as they reached the semi-finals of the UEFA Cup.

FC Utrecht and career-ending injury
On 27 August 2008, Neșu was sold to FC Utrecht for €1.2 to replace PSV Eindhoven-bound Erik Pieters. He played 86 Eredivisie matches and scored two goals during his stint, and in 2008 was named the best left-back of the competition.

On 10 May 2011, Neșu got injured during a training session by colliding with teammate Alje Schut; he broke his cervical vertebrae, which left him paralysed in a wheel chair ever since. His FC Utrecht contract expired in July 2012, formally ending his footballing career.

In 2020, he was selected by FC Utrecht fans as the best left-back the team's history.

International career
Neșu appeared eight times at international level for Romania, with manager Victor Pițurcă handing him his full debut on 12 November 2005, when he replaced Răzvan Raț in the 80th minute of a friendly 1–2 loss to Ivory Coast. He also played in a 1–0 away victory against the Faroe Islands at the 2010 World Cup qualifiers. His last game for the national team was a friendly which ended in a 0–2 loss to Israel, on 3 March 2010.

Personal life
Neșu's father, Mircea, was a footballer, referee, and doctor. His nephew Nikos Barboudis is also a football player.

Neșu married Maria Laura Gherman in June 2006, but they divorced after six years.

Philanthropy
In the 2012–13 season, Steaua București honoured Neșu by displaying the logo of his namesake foundation on the club's kit in the UEFA Europa League matches against Ekranas, Ajax and Chelsea.

As of January 2022, Neșu manages the construction of a new and larger rehabilitation centre in Oradea for children with motor disorders.

Honours
Steaua București
Divizia A: 2004–05, 2005–06
Supercupa României: 2006

References

External links
 Mihai Neșu Foundation official website 
 Mihai Neșu at Voetbal International 
 
 
 

1982 births
Living people
Sportspeople from Oradea
Romanian footballers
Association football defenders
Liga I players
FC Steaua București players
Eredivisie players
FC Utrecht players
Romania international footballers
Romanian expatriate footballers
Expatriate footballers in the Netherlands
Romanian expatriate sportspeople in the Netherlands
Romanian philanthropists